Bon Voyage (German: Glückliche Reise) is a 1933 German musical comedy film directed by Alfred Abel and starring Magda Schneider, Ekkehard Arendt and Max Hansen. It was shot at the EFA Studios in Berlin. The film's sets were designed by the art director Manfred Hoermann. Based on Eduard Künneke's 1932 operetta , it is an operetta film, a genre that was enjoying popularity at the time. It was filmed again in 1954.

Cast
 Magda Schneider as Monika Brink
  as Lona Vonderhoff
 Max Hansen as	Stefan Schwarzenberg
 Ekkehard Arendt as Robert Hartenau
 Paul Henckels as Fritz Homann
 Adele Sandrock as Tante Henriette
 Hugo Fischer-Köppe as Kapitän Brangersen
 Margarete Kupfer as Frau Maschke

References

Bibliography 
 Goble, Alan. The Complete Index to Literary Sources in Film. Walter de Gruyter, 1999.
 Klaus, Ulrich J. Deutsche Tonfilme: Jahrgang 1933. Klaus-Archiv, 1988.
 Waldman, Harry. Nazi Films In America, 1933–1942. McFarland & Co, 2008.

External links 
 

1933 films
Films of Nazi Germany
1930s German-language films
Films directed by Alfred Abel
1930s German films
German musical comedy films
1933 comedy films
1933 musical films
Operetta films
Films shot at Halensee Studios